The Black Tulip is a historical novel written by Alexandre Dumas, père.

The Black Tulip can also refer to:

 The Black Tulip (1921 film), a 1921 Dutch film
 The Black Tulip (1937 film), a 1937 British film
 The Black Tulip (1963 film), a 1963 French film
 The Black Tulip (2010 film), a 2010 American film filmed in Afghanistan
 Impossible Black Tulip (map), (1602 map) the first European-style World map in Chinese

See also
 Black Tulip (disambiguation)